Colette Darfeuil (born Emma Henriette Augustine Floquet, 7 February 1906 – 15 October 1998) was a French actress whose film career began at age 14 in 1920 and continued through the early 1950s.

Darfeuil made her screen debut in at age 14 in the 1920 Pierre Colombier-directed silent film Les Étrennes à travers les âges and would work steadily through the silent era and into the sound era.

Selected filmography
 The Flame (1926)
 Sables (1927)
 What a Woman Dreams of in Springtime (1929)
  The Man Without Love  (1929)
 The Prosecutor Hallers (1930)
 Wine Cellars (1930)
 End of the World (1931)
 About an Inquest (1931)
 For an Evening (1931)
 Buridan's Donkey (1932)
 Baroud (1932)
 All for Love (1933)
 To Be Loved (1933)
 Le Roi des Champs-Élysées (1934)
 My Heart Is Calling You (1934)
 Casanova (1934)
 The House on the Dune (1934)
 The Flame (1936)
 Michel Strogoff (1936)
 On the Road (1936)
 The Patriot (1938)
 Forces occultes (1943)
 The Stairs Without End (1943)
 The Misfortunes of Sophie (1946)
 The Ferret (1950)
 Bibi Fricotin (1950)
 The Girl with the Whip (1952)
 This Age Without Pity (1952)

Further reading
Raymond Chirat and Olivier Barrot, Les excentriques du cinéma français: 1929-1958, Paris: Henri Veyrier, 1983. 
Foucart, Yvan. Dictionnaire des comédiens français disparus, Mormoiron: Éditions cinéma, p. 1185, 2008

References

External links

CinéArtistes

1906 births
1998 deaths
French film actresses
French silent film actresses
People from Yvelines
20th-century French actresses